The 2010 L&H 500 was the ninth event of the 2010 V8 Supercar Championship Series.  It was held on the weekend of 10 to 12 September at the Phillip Island Grand Prix Circuit in Victoria, Australia. The 2010 event was the tenth running of the Phillip Island 500 and it marked the third time that the Phillip Island circuit had served as the venue for the annual 500 kilometre two-driver V8 Supercar race. The event consisted of two Qualifying sessions, two Qualifying Races and a 500 kilometre race which was Race 17 of the Championship. The two drivers nominated for each car contested separate qualifying sessions and, unique to this event, two preliminary 14 lap Qualifying Races were held on Saturday with the two drivers of each car starting one race each. A single pitstop by each car in either race was mandated with the combined results of the two races determining the grid order for the main 500 kilometre race. Championship points were awarded for each of the three races, however the finishing positions of the "L & H 500" were determined by the finishing positions at the end of Race 17, regardless of the total number of points accumulated by any driver pairing at the event.

The 500 kilometre race was dominated by the Triple Eight Race Engineering team and was won by Craig Lowndes and Mark Skaife. Engine trouble struck teammates Jamie Whincup and Steve Owen while leading and saw them finish last of the classified finishers. The win gave Skaife his 40th career round win in the series, increasing his record tally. Late in the race Ford Performance Racing's lead driver, Mark Winterbottom overtook Jason Richards for second place which saw himself and co-driver Luke Youlden finish best of the Ford entries, ahead of Richards and Andrew Jones in the Brad Jones Racing Commodore.

Results

Race 1 Qualifying session

Race 2 Qualifying session

Qualifying Race 1
Qualifying Race 1 was won by Steve Owen (Holden VE Commodore) from Jason Bargwanna (Holden VE Commodore) and Shane van Gisbergen (Ford FG Falcon).

Qualifying Race 2
Qualifying Race 2 was won by Rick Kelly (Holden VE Commodore) from Craig Lowndes (Holden VE Commodore) and James Courtney (Ford FG Falcon).

L&H 500

References

External links
Official L & H 500 website
Official series website

L and H 500
Motorsport at Phillip Island
Phillip Island 500
Pre-Bathurst 500